The Alaska boundary dispute was a territorial dispute between the United States and the United Kingdom of Great Britain and Ireland, which then controlled Canada's foreign relations. It was resolved by arbitration in 1903. The dispute had existed between the Russian Empire and Britain since 1821, and was inherited by the United States as a consequence of the Alaska Purchase in 1867. The final resolution favored the American position, as Canada did not get an all-Canadian outlet from the Yukon gold fields to the sea. The disappointment and anger in Canada was directed less at the United States, and more at the British government for betraying Canadian interests in favor of healthier Anglo-American relations.

Background

1825–1898

In 1825 Russia and the United Kingdom signed a treaty to define the borders of their respective colonial possessions, the Anglo-Russian Convention of 1825. Part of the wording of the treaty was that:

The vague phrase "the mountains parallel to the coast" was further qualified thus:

This part of the treaty language was an agreement on general principles for establishing a boundary in the area in the future, rather than any exact demarcated line.

Signed in 1839, the RAC–HBC Agreement created an understanding between the Russian-American Company and the Hudson's Bay Company. Typically referred to as the lisière (edge), a stretch of the Alaskan Panhandle from Cross Sound to 54° 40′ was given to the HBC as a fur trade monopoly in exchange for the agricultural and pastoral products produced by its subsidiary, the Puget Sound Agricultural Company, along with an annual amount of furs given to the Russian company. The lease was renewed until the end of Russian America. This lease was later brought up by the Province of British Columbia as bearing upon its own territorial interests in the region, but was ignored by Ottawa and London.

The United States bought Alaska in 1867 from Russia in the Alaska Purchase, but the boundary terms were ambiguous. In 1871, British Columbia united with the new Dominion of Canada. The Canadian government requested a survey of the boundary, but the United States rejected it as too costly; the border area was very remote and sparsely settled, and without economic or strategic interest. In 1898, the national governments agreed on a compromise, but the government of British Columbia rejected it. U.S. President McKinley proposed a permanent lease to Canada of a port near Haines, but Canada rejected that compromise.

Klondike gold rush
In 1897–98 the Klondike Gold Rush in Yukon, Canada, enormously increased the population of the general area, which reached 30,000, composed largely of Americans. Some 100,000 fortune seekers moved through Alaska to the Klondike gold region.

The presence of gold and a large new population greatly increased the importance of the region and the desirability of fixing an exact boundary. Canada wanted an all-Canadian route from the gold fields to a seaport. There were claims that Canadian citizens were harassed by the United States as a deterrent to making any land claims.

The head of Lynn Canal was the main gateway to the Yukon, and the North-West Mounted Police (NWMP) sent a detachment to secure the location for Canada. This was based on Canada's assertion that that location was more than ten marine leagues from the sea, which was part of the 1825 boundary definition. A massive influx of American stampeders through Skagway very quickly forced the Canadian police to retreat. They set up posts on the desolate summits of Chilkoot and White Passes, complete with a mounted Gatling gun at each post. To back up the police in their sovereignty claim, the Canadian government also sent the Yukon Field Force, a 200-man Army unit, to the territory. The soldiers set up camp at Fort Selkirk so that they could be fairly quickly dispatched to deal with problems at either the coastal passes or the 141st meridian west.

Arbitration

The posts set up on the passes by the NWMP were effective in the short term, as the provisional boundary was accepted, if grudgingly. In September 1898, serious negotiations began between the United States and Canada to settle the issue, but those meetings failed.

The treaty of 1825 was drawn up in French, and the 1903 British advocates discussed the exact meaning of words like "/coast", "/strip" and "/crest". The maps of George Vancouver, which were used as a fixing line by the commission of 1825, showed a continuous line of mountains parallel to the coast — however, the mountain range is neither parallel to the coast nor continuous.

Finally, in 1903, the Hay–Herbert Treaty between the United States and the United Kingdom entrusted the decision to an arbitration by a mixed tribunal of six members: three Americans (Elihu Root, Secretary of War; Henry Cabot Lodge, senator from Massachusetts; and George Turner, ex-senator from Washington), two Canadians (Sir Louis A. Jette, Lieutenant Governor of Quebec; and Allen B. Aylesworth, K.C., from Toronto), and one Briton (Baron Alverstone). All sides respected Root, but he was a member of the U.S. Cabinet. Canadians ridiculed the choice of the obscure ex-Senator Turner and, especially, Lodge, a leading historian and diplomatic specialist whom they saw as unobjective.

The tribunal considered six main points:
 Where the boundary began.
 What "Portland Channel" meant, and how to draw the boundary line through it. Four islands were in dispute.
 The definition of the line from "the southernmost point of Prince of Wales Island to Portland Channel", which depended on the answer to the previous question.
 The line from Portland Channel to the 56th parallel north.
 Whether mountain ranges existed in the area.

The British member Lord Alverstone sided with the U.S. position on these basic issues, although the final agreed demarcation line fell significantly short of the maximal U.S. claim (it was a compromise falling roughly between the maximal U.S. and maximal Canadian claim). The "BC Panhandle" (the Tatshenshini-Alsek region) was not quite exclaved from the rest of British Columbia.

In 1929 Canadian scholar Hugh L. L. Keenlyside concluded, "The Americans, of course, did have the better case." He judged that most of the tribunal's decisions were fair. Regarding the key issue of the islands in the Portland Channel, however,

This was one of several concessions that Britain offered to the United States (the others being on fisheries and the Panama Canal). It was part of a general policy of ending the chill in Britain–U.S. relations, achieving rapprochement, winning American favor, and resolving outstanding issues (the Great Rapprochement).

Aftermath

Growth of a distinct Canadian identity
Keenlyside and Brown wrote that

The Canadian judges refused to sign the award, issued on 20 October 1903, due to the Canadian delegates' disagreement with Lord Alverstone's vote. Canadians protested the outcome, not so much the decision itself but that the Americans had chosen politicians instead of jurists for the tribunal, and that the British had helped their own interests by betraying Canada's. This led to intense anti-British emotions erupting throughout Canada (including Quebec) as well as a surge in Canadian nationalism as separate from an imperial identity. Although suspicions of the U.S. provoked by the award may have contributed to Canada's rejection of a free trade with the United States in the 1911 "reciprocity election", historian F. W. Gibson concluded that Canadians vented their anger less upon the United States and "to a greater degree upon Great Britain for having offered such feeble resistance to American aggressiveness. The circumstances surrounding the settlement of the dispute produced serious dissatisfaction with Canada's position in the British Empire." Infuriated, like most Canadians, Prime Minister Wilfrid Laurier explained to Parliament, "So long as Canada remains a dependency of the British Crown the present powers that we have are not sufficient for the maintenance of our rights." Canadian anger gradually subsided, but the feeling that Canada should control its own foreign policy may have contributed to the Statute of Westminster.

See also
 List of areas disputed by the United States and Canada
 Foreign relations of Canada
 Canada–United States border
 Canada–United States relations
 Canada–United Kingdom relations
 United Kingdom–United States relations
 Aroostook War
 Pig War
 Oregon boundary dispute
 List of Boundary Peaks of the Alaska–British Columbia/Yukon border

References

Bibliography
 Bailey, Thomas A. "Theodore Roosevelt and the Alaska Boundary Settlement", Canadian Historical Review (1937) 18#2 pp: 123-130.
 Carroll, F. M. "Robert Lansing and the Alaska Boundary Settlement". International History Review 1987 9(2): 271-290. in JSTOR
 Cranny, Michael "Horizons: Canada Moves West" pg 256 1999 Prentice Hall Ginn Canada
 Gelber, Lionel M. The rise of Anglo-American friendship: a study in world politics, 1898-1906 (1938)
 Gibson, F. W. "The Alaskan Boundary Dispute", Canadian Historical Association Report (1945) pp 25–40
 Haglund, David G. and Tudor Onea, "Victory without Triumph: Theodore Roosevelt, Honour, and the Alaska Panhandle Boundary Dispute", Diplomacy and Statecraft (March 2008) 19#1 pp 20–41
 Kohn, Edward P. This Kindred People: Canadian-American Relations and the Anglo-Saxon Idea, 1895-1903 (2005)
 Munro, John A. "English-Canadianism and the Demand for Canadian Autonomy: Ontario's Response to the Alaska Boundary Decision, 1903". Ontario History 1965 57(4): 189-203. 
 Munro, John A., ed. The Alaska Boundary Dispute (Copp Clark Publishing Company, 1970), primary and secondary sources
 Neary, Peter. "Grey, Bryce, and the Settlement of Canadian‐American Differences, 1905–1911" Canadian Historical Review (1968) 49#4 pp 357–380. ... 
 Penlington, Norman. The Alaska Boundary Dispute: A Critical Reappraisal. McGraw-Hill Ryerson, 1972. 120 pp.

Further reading
 Alexander Begg, Report relative to the Alaska Boundary Question, submitted to the Hon. J.H. Turner, Minister of Finance etc. etc. (sic), 15 August 1896., Victoria, British Columbia: R. Wolfenden, 1896]
 Alexander Begg, Review of the Alaskan boundary question, Victoria, British Columbia, publ. Unknown, 1900]
 Alexander Begg, Statement of facts regarding the Alaska boundary question, Victoria, British Columbia, publ. R. Wolfenden, 1902, report to David McEwen Eberts, Attorney-General of British Columbia.
 Survey of boundary line between Alaska and British Columbia : letter from the Acting Secretary of the Treasury, transmitting a communication from the Secretary of State, submitting an estimate of appropriation for survey of the boundary line between Alaska and British Columbia, R.Wike, US Dept. of State, publ. s.l.: s.n., 1895.
 British Columbia from the earliest times to the present, Vol 2, Chapter XXXI - Alaska Boundary Dispute, E.O.S. Scholefield & Frederic William Howay, S.J. Clarke Pub. Co., Vancouver, British Columbia, 1914

1903 in Alaska
Alexander Archipelago
Arbitration cases
Canada–United States border
Canada–United States border disputes
Political history of British Columbia
Pre-statehood history of Alaska
1903 in international relations